Electrip is the second of three studio albums by the German band Xhol Caravan, an influential member of the krautrock music movement. The album was recorded and released in 1969, and marks a significant departure from the band’s debut effort, 1967’s Get in High. While that album spotlighted the American blues origins of then-singers Ronnie Swinson and James Rhodes, by 1969 Rhodes and Swinson were gone and so were pop and blues conventions. Electrip abandons these in favor of extended forays into progressive rock, free jazz, fusion, improvisation, and experimentation. Originally released on Hansa Records, the album was re-packaged and re-released in 2000 on the Garden of Delights label.

Critical reception
On Allmusic, Electrip was rated 4.5 out of 5 stars and is described as "a classic of early Krautrock, a uniquely German twist that took rock & roll into new realms, and the record was a blueprint for the many German jazz-rock groups that followed."

Track listing

Personnel
 Skip van Wyk – drums
 Tim Belbe – saxophone
 Klaus Briest – bass
 Öcki Brevert – keyboards
 Hansi Fischer – flute, sax
 Peter Meisel – noises

References

External links
  Electrip at Discogs.com

1969 albums
Xhol Caravan albums